Richard Allen Podolor (January 7, 1936 – March 9, 2022) was an American musician, record producer and songwriter.  His career started as a session musician in the 1950s, and he was best known as the producer of Three Dog Night.

Life and career
Podolor was born in Los Angeles on January 7 1936, and learned guitar as a child. He became a session musician at the age of 16, and played on Bonnie Guitar's hit, "Dark Moon", in 1956. He made some recordings as Dickie Podolor in the late 1950s, and toured as a member of the Pets, a group that also included session musicians Plas Johnson and Earl Palmer. He played on the Pets' 1958 hit "Cha Hua Hua". His success as a musician enabled his family to open a recording studio, the American Recording Company, initially run by his brother Don Podolor. Together with drummer Sandy Nelson, Richie Podolor recorded a demo of "Teen Beat", but the song was then taken up and recorded by other musicians with Nelson, becoming a hit in 1959. Because Podolor was not given a co-writing credit for "Teen Beat", Nelson later credited him with co-writing some of his later recordings, including his 1961 hit "Let There Be Drums".

Podolor released recordings for Imperial Records in the early 1960s, using the name Richie Allen (or, on one single, Dickie Allen). His 1960 single "Stranger from Durango" reached No. 90 on the Billboard Hot 100. His early 1960s albums as the leader of Richie Allen and the Pacific Surfers featured top Los Angeles session musicians including René Hall, Tommy Tedesco, Plas Johnson, Lincoln Mayorga, and Sandy Nelson. Two of these Imperial albums, The Rising Surf and Surfer's Slide, were later reissued on CD.

He continued to record under his own name as well as working as a session musician. By the mid-1960s, he increasingly worked as an audio engineer as well as a musician, on recordings by the Monkees, the Turtles, the Electric Prunes, the Grateful Dead, Donovan, and others. He produced two studio albums for Steppenwolf, engineered all their early hits including "Born to Be Wild", and produced Three Dog Night's "Mama Told Me Not to Come" and "Joy to the World", leading to his work on all subsequent albums by Three Dog Night. Other acts with whom he worked as a producer included Alice Cooper, Iron Butterfly, the Dillards, Chris Hillman, and Black Oak Arkansas.

Podolor passed in his sleep on March 9, 2022, at the age of 86.

Discography (producer)

Three Dog Night
 Captured Live at the Forum (1969) (ABC-Dunhill/MCA)
 It Ain't Easy (1970) (ABC-Dunhill/MCA)
 Naturally (1970) (ABC-Dunhill/MCA)
 Golden Bisquits (1971) (ABC-Dunhill/MCA) – co-produced with Gabriel Mekler 
 Harmony (1971) (ABC-Dunhill/MCA)
 Seven Separate Fools (1972) (ABC-Dunhill/MCA)
 Cyan (1973) (ABC-Dunhill/MCA)
 Around the World with Three Dog Night (1973) (ABC-Dunhill/MCA)
 Joy to the World: Their Greatest Hits (1974) (ABC-Dunhill/MCA) – co-producer with Gabriel Mekler and Jimmy Ienner
 The Best of 3 Dog Night (1982) (MCA) – co-producer with Gabriel Mekler and Jimmy Ienner
 It's a Jungle (1983) (Passport)

Iron Butterfly
 Live (1970) (Atco)
 Metamorphosis (1970) (Atco)

Blues Image
 "Ride Captain Ride" (1970) (Atco)
 Open (1970) (Atco)
 Red White & Blues Image (1970) (Atco)

The Dillards
 Roots and Branches (1972) (Anthem Records)

Jellyroll
 Jellyroll (1971) (Kapp US, MCA UK and Germany)

The Souther-Hillman-Furay Band
 The Souther-Hillman-Furay Band (1974) (Asylum)

Chris Hillman
 Like a Hurricane (1998) (Sugar Hill)

20/20
 Look Out! (1981)

Alice Cooper
 Special Forces (1981) (Warner Bros.)

Phil Seymour
 Phil Seymour (1981)
 Phil Seymour 2 (1982)
 “Prince of Power Pop” (2017)

Dwight Twilley
 The Luck (recorded 1994, released 2001)

Steppenwolf
 Steppenwolf 7 (ABC/Dunhill) (producer) (1970) 
 Gold: Their Great Hits (ABC/Dunhill) (co-producer w/Bill Cooper) and (producer) (1970) 
 For Ladies Only (ABC/Dunhill) (producer) (1971) 
 16 Greatest Hits (ABC/Dunhill) (co-producer w/Bill Cooper) and (producer) (1973)

John Kay & Steppenwolf
 Paradox (Attic) (1984)

Alcatrazz
 Dangerous Games (1986) (EMI Records)

London
  Playa Del Rock (NOISE/BMG Records) (1990)

References

External links
Biography on Rockabilly Europe website
American Entertainment official website
Obituary of Richie Podolor in Best Classic Bands
 
 
 

1936 births
2022 deaths
The Wrecking Crew (music) members
Record producers from California
Songwriters from California
Musicians from Los Angeles